Marcos Sánchez may refer to:

 Marcos Sánchez (basketball), Chilean basketball player
 Marcos Sánchez (footballer, born 1989), Panamanian midfielder
 Marcos Sánchez (footballer, born 1990), Argentine defender